Mariya Vasiliyevna Abakumova (born 15 January 1986) is a Russian former track and field athlete who competed in the javelin throw.

Career
Abakumova discovered her love for athletics and throwing through her coach Irina Vladimirovna Kamarova. Her parents were also active in athletics and served as role models.

Abakumova is a two-time Olympian; she competed at the 2008 and 2012 Summer Olympics. In 2008 she initially won silver. In 2012 she initially finished tenth. She also initially won gold at the 2011 World Championships. In 2013, she won the Summer Universiade with a throw of 65.12 m, and later that year she won bronze at the World Championships with a 65.09 m throw.

In May 2016, it was reported that Abakumova was one of 14 Russian athletes, and nine medalists, implicated in doping following the retesting of urine from the 2008 Olympic Games. Abakumova was named by Russian press agency TASS as having failed the retest, which was undertaken following the Russian doping scandal of 2015 and 2016. If confirmed, under IOC and IAAF rules, Abakumova stood to lose all results, medals, and records from the date of the original test to May 2016. On 13 September 2016, her doping was confirmed by the IOC. Her results at the 2008 Olympics were voided, and she had to return the medal she won. Abakumova appealed the IOC's decision to the Court of Arbitration for Sport (CAS). On 26 July 2018 the CAS dismissed Abakumova's appeal and upheld the IOC's decision.

Personal life
Abakumova is married to the Russian javelin thrower Dmitry Tarabin. In June 2014 she had twins who were named Kira and Milana.

International competitions

See also
List of doping cases in athletics
List of stripped Olympic medals
List of World Athletics Championships medalists (women)
Doping at the Olympic Games
Doping in Russia

References

External links

1986 births
Living people
Sportspeople from Stavropol
Russian female javelin throwers
Olympic female javelin throwers
Olympic athletes of Russia
Athletes (track and field) at the 2008 Summer Olympics
Athletes (track and field) at the 2012 Summer Olympics
Competitors stripped of Summer Olympics medals
World Athletics Championships athletes for Russia
World Athletics Championships medalists
Universiade gold medalists in athletics (track and field)
Universiade gold medalists for Russia
Medalists at the 2013 Summer Universiade
Russian Athletics Championships winners
Russian sportspeople in doping cases
Doping cases in athletics
21st-century Russian women